Wedding Pullav is an Indian romantic comedy film, directed by Binod Pradhan and produced by Shashi Ranjan and Anu Ranjan. The film stars debutants Kannada actor Diganth, Anushka Ranjan, Sonnalli Seygall and Karan V. Grover in lead roles. The film was released on 16 October 2015 to negative reviews.

Plot
Wedding Pullav shows the story of two best friends, Aditya a.k.a. Adi and Anushka who are in love but are unaware of it. When Anushka is invited to attend Adi's wedding, this love confusion further increases. On one hand, Adi is jealous with Anushka's boyfriend while on the other side Anushka does not like Adi's marriage to another girl whom she initially praises. The story then moves to a stage where they know their feelings but not sure what to do next.

Cast
 Diganth Manchale as Aditya (Adi)
 Anushka Ranjan as Anushka
 Parmeet Sethi as Kumar
 Sonnalli Seygall as Rhea
 Karan V. Grover as Jay
 Rishi Kapoor as Luv Kapoor
 Satish Kaushik as Adi's father
 Upasana Singh as Adi's mother
 Kitu Gidwani as Amrita
 Dhritiman Chatterjee as Sid Kapoor
 Himani Shivpuri as Gulabo
 Tripta Lakhan Pai as Beejee
 Aru Verma as Petha
 Neha Tomar as Nikki
 Ali Khan as Batli

Soundtrack

Box office
The film collected approximately  within two days of its release.it was the biggest flop of the year and received a lot of flak for its fake reviews.

References

External links
 

2015 films
2010s Hindi-language films
Indian romantic comedy films
2015 romantic comedy films
Films about Indian weddings
2015 directorial debut films